Aberhosan is a village in the Welsh principal area of Powys, located between the town of Machynlleth and village of Dylife. It is in the historic county of Montgomeryshire.

History

The village school closed before 1971, and is now the village hall. The village has a chapel but its shop has closed.

Wynford Vaughan-Thomas

In 1990 a memorial was unveiled at the Cadair viewpoint (at ) to the broadcaster and writer Wynford Vaughan-Thomas. It is a toposcope, looking out over the rolling hills and mountains, with a depiction of Vaughan-Thomas pointing towards Snowdon, Wales' highest peak, which is just visible on a clear day.

Internet issues

In September 2020 the BBC reported that the village had had serious issues with its broadband internet connectivity for the previous 18 months. BT Openreach engineers investigated the problem using a spectrum analyser and found that the issue was caused by a resident who was using an old television. After the TV was disposed of the issues ended.

References

External links 

Photos of Aberhosan and surrounding area on geograph
https://thenextweb.com/insights/2020/09/22/old-tv-breaks-internet-village/

Villages in Powys